The tetrode field-effect transistor or field-effect tetrode is a solid-state semiconductor device, constructed by creating two field-effect channels back-to-back, with a junction between. It is a four-terminal device which does not have specific gate terminals because each channel is a gate for the other, the voltage conditions modulating the current carried by the other channel.

Current–voltage relationship

and

,

Applications

The field-effect tetrode can be used as a highly linear electronically variable resistor – resistance is not modulated by signal voltage. Signal voltage can exceed bias voltage, pinch-off voltage, and junction breakdown voltage. The limit is dependent on dissipation. Signal current flows in inverse proportion to the channel resistances. The signal does not modulate the depletion layer, so the tetrode can perform at high frequencies. The tuning ratio can be very large – the high resistance limit is in the megohms range for symmetrical pinch-off conditions.

See also
Field-effect transistor
Multigate device, other multi-gate devices
Tetrode transistor, any transistor having four active terminals

References

Semiconductor devices